The Lutheran High School of Indianapolis is a Lutheran secondary school in Indianapolis, Indiana, USA.

History
The Lutheran High School of Indianapolis was conceived by a large group of Indianapolis area Lutherans in the early 1970s. By 1974, sufficient interest was in place to create "The Greater Indianapolis Association for Lutheran Secondary Education, Inc." The Association incorporated with the state of Indiana on February 14, 1975. The school's first principal, Kenneth Wunderlich, was called to serve July 2, 1975. He spent the first year laying the groundwork for opening the school for the 1976-77 school year. The doors opened August 30, 1976, for fourteen students in grades 9 and 10. The school first met in the former Franklin Township High School building (later demolished), renting it from the Franklin Township School District from 1976 to 1991. The current facility opened its doors on Arlington Avenue on May 1, 1991.

Carl Schulenburg and Richard Johnson were called to join Wunderlich as the school's first full-time faculty members. Pat Slater and Maria Tessler were hired as part-time teachers. The school's second principal, Richard Block, was called in 1985 and served until 2000. David Beringer served as executive director from 2000 to 2005. Gary St Clair was named principal in 2005. David Sommermeyer was named interim director in 2010. Mike Brandt was called to the position of director in the Summer of 2011 and is to present.

Student enrollment in 2007-08 topped 300 students for the first time under the guidance of 30 full- and part-time faculty members. The graduation of the Class of 2008 saw the 1,200th alumnus cross the stage at commencement.

Athletics
Lutheran's athletic nickname is the Saints and they compete in the Indiana Crossroads Conference. They have won five state championships over the years.

See also
 List of high schools in Indiana

References

25 Years in God's Grace 1976-2000, Published by Lutheran High School of Indianapolis, 2001

External links
 Official site

Schools in Indianapolis
Private high schools in Indiana
Educational institutions established in 1976
Secondary schools affiliated with the Lutheran Church–Missouri Synod
1976 establishments in Indiana
Lutheran schools in Indiana